The Umayyad Caliphate (661–750 CE) was the second caliphate established after the death of the Islamic prophet Muhammad. Uthman ibn Affan (r. 644–656), the third of the Rashidun caliphs, was also a member of the clan. The family established dynastic, hereditary rule with Muawiya ibn Abi Sufyan, long-time governor of Greater Syria, who became caliph after the end of the First Fitna in 661. After Mu'awiya's death in 680, conflicts over the succession resulted in the Second Fitna, and power eventually fell to Marwan I, from another branch of the clan. Syria remained the Umayyads' main power base thereafter, with Damascus as their capital.

The Umayyads continued the Muslim conquests, conquering Ifriqiya, Transoxiana, Sind, the Maghreb and Hispania (al-Andalus). At its greatest extent, the Umayyad Caliphate covered , making it one of the largest empires in history in terms of area. The dynasty was toppled by the Abbasids in 750. Survivors of the dynasty established themselves in Cordoba which, in the form of an emirate and then a caliphate, became a world centre of science, medicine, philosophy and invention during the Islamic Golden Age.

The Umayyad Caliphate ruled over a vast multiethnic and multicultural population. Christians, who still constituted a majority of the caliphate's population, and Jews were allowed to practice their own religion but had to pay the jizya (poll tax) from which Muslims were exempt. Muslims were required to pay the zakat tax, which was earmarked explicitly for various welfare programmes for the benefit of Muslims or Muslim converts. Under the early Umayyad caliphs, prominent positions were held by Christians, some of whom belonged to families that had served the Byzantines. The employment of Christians was part of a broader policy of religious accommodation that was necessitated by the presence of large Christian populations in the conquered provinces, as in Syria. This policy also boosted Mu'awiya's popularity and solidified Syria as his power base. The Umayyad era is often considered the formative period in Islamic art.

History

Origins

Early influence
During the pre-Islamic period, the Umayyads or 'Banu Umayya' were a leading clan of the Quraysh tribe of Mecca. By the end of the 6th century, the Umayyads dominated the Quraysh's increasingly prosperous trade networks with Syria and developed economic and military alliances with the nomadic Arab tribes that controlled the northern and central Arabian desert expanses, affording the clan a degree of political power in the region. The Umayyads under the leadership of Abu Sufyan ibn Harb were the principal leaders of Meccan opposition to the Islamic prophet Muhammad, but after the latter captured Mecca in 630, Abu Sufyan and the Quraysh embraced Islam. To reconcile his influential Qurayshite tribesmen, Muhammad gave his former opponents, including Abu Sufyan, a stake in the new order. Abu Sufyan and the Umayyads relocated to Medina, Islam's political centre, to maintain their new-found political influence in the nascent Muslim community.

Muhammad's death in 632 left open the succession of leadership of the Muslim community. Leaders of the Ansar, the natives of Medina who had provided Muhammad safe haven after his emigration from Mecca in 622, discussed forwarding their own candidate out of concern that the Muhajirun, Muhammad's early followers and fellow emigrants from Mecca, would ally with their fellow tribesmen from the former Qurayshite elite and take control of the Muslim state. The Muhajirun gave allegiance to one of their own, the early, elderly companion of Muhammad, Abu Bakr, and put an end to Ansarite deliberations. Abu Bakr was viewed as acceptable by the Ansar and the Qurayshite elite and was acknowledged as caliph (leader of the Muslim community). He showed favor to the Umayyads by awarding them command roles in the Muslim conquest of Syria. One of the appointees was Yazid, the son of Abu Sufyan, who owned property and maintained trade networks in Syria.

Abu Bakr's successor Umar curtailed the influence of the Qurayshite elite in favor of Muhammad's earlier supporters in the administration and military, but nonetheless allowed the growing foothold of Abu Sufyan's sons in Syria, which was all but conquered by 638. When Umar's overall commander of the province Abu Ubayda ibn al-Jarrah died in 639, he appointed Yazid governor of Syria's Damascus, Palestine and Jordan districts. Yazid died shortly after and Umar appointed his brother Mu'awiya in his place. Umar's exceptional treatment of Abu Sufyan's sons may have stemmed from his respect for the family, their burgeoning alliance with the powerful Banu Kalb tribe as a counterbalance to the influential Himyarite settlers in Homs who viewed themselves as equals to the Quraysh in nobility, or the lack of a suitable candidate at the time, particularly amid the plague of Amwas which had already killed Abu Ubayda and Yazid. Under Mu'awiya's stewardship, Syria remained domestically peaceful, organized and well-defended from its former Byzantine rulers.

Caliphate of Uthman

Umar's successor, Uthman ibn Affan, was a wealthy Umayyad and early Muslim convert with marital ties to Muhammad. He was elected by the shura council, composed of Muhammad's cousin Ali, al-Zubayr ibn al-Awwam, Talha ibn Ubayd Allah, Sa'd ibn Abi Waqqas and Abd al-Rahman ibn Awf, all of whom were close, early companions of Muhammad and belonged to the Quraysh. He was chosen over Ali because he would ensure the concentration of state power into the hands of the Quraysh, as opposed to Ali's determination to diffuse power among all of the Muslim factions. From early in his reign, Uthman displayed explicit favouritism to his kinsmen, in stark contrast to his predecessors. He appointed his family members as governors over the regions successively conquered under Umar and himself, namely much of the Sasanian Empire, i.e. Iraq and Iran, and the former Byzantine territories of Syria and Egypt. In Medina, he relied extensively on the counsel of his Umayyad cousins, the brothers al-Harith and Marwan ibn al-Hakam. According to the historian Wilferd Madelung, this policy stemmed from Uthman's "conviction that the house of Umayya, as the core clan of Quraysh, was uniquely qualified to rule in the name of Islam".

Uthman's nepotism provoked the ire of the Ansar and the members of the shura. In 645/46, he added the Jazira (Upper Mesopotamia) to Mu'awiya's Syrian governorship and granted the latter's request to take possession of all Byzantine crown lands in Syria to help pay his troops. He had the surplus taxes from the wealthy provinces of Kufa and Egypt forwarded to the treasury in Medina, which he used at his personal disposal, frequently disbursing its funds and war booty to his Umayyad relatives. Moreover, the lucrative Sasanian crown lands of Iraq, which Umar had designated as communal property for the benefit of the Arab garrison towns of Kufa and Basra, were turned into caliphal crown lands to be used at Uthman's discretion. Mounting resentment against Uthman's rule in Iraq and Egypt and among the Ansar and Quraysh of Medina culminated in the siege and killing of the caliph in 656. In the assessment of the historian Hugh N. Kennedy, Uthman was killed because of his determination to centralize control over the caliphate's government by the traditional elite of the Quraysh, particularly his Umayyad clan, which he believed possessed the "experience and ability" to govern, at the expense of the interests, rights and privileges of many early Muslims.

First Fitna
After Uthman's assassination, Ali was recognized as caliph in Medina, though his support stemmed from the Ansar and the Iraqis, while the bulk of the Quraysh was wary of his rule. The first challenge to his authority came from the Qurayshite leaders al-Zubayr and Talha, who had opposed Uthman's empowerment of the Umayyad clan but feared that their own influence and the power of the Quraysh, in general, would dissipate under Ali. Backed by one of Muhammad's wives, A'isha, they attempted to rally support against Ali among the troops of Basra, prompting the caliph to leave for Iraq's other garrison town, Kufa, where he could better confront his challengers. Ali defeated them at the Battle of the Camel, in which al-Zubayr and Talha were slain and A'isha consequently entered self-imposed seclusion. Ali's sovereignty was thereafter recognized in Basra and Egypt and he established Kufa as the caliphate's new capital.

Although Ali was able to replace Uthman's governors in Egypt and Iraq with relative ease, Mu'awiya had developed a solid power-base and an effective military against the Byzantines from the Arab tribes of Syria. Mu'awiya did not claim the caliphate but was determined to retain control of Syria and opposed Ali in the name of avenging his kinsman Uthman, accusing the caliph of culpability in his death. Ali and Mu'awiya fought to a stalemate at the Battle of Siffin in early 657. Ali agreed to settle the matter with Mu'awiya by arbitration, though the talks failed to achieve a resolution. The decision to arbitrate fundamentally weakened Ali's political position as he was forced to negotiate with Mu'awiya on equal terms, while it drove a significant number of his supporters, who became known as the Kharijites, to revolt. Ali's coalition steadily disintegrated and many Iraqi tribal nobles secretly defected to Mu'awiya, while the latter's ally Amr ibn al-As ousted Ali's governor from Egypt in July 658. In July 660 Mu'awiya was formally recognized as caliph in Jerusalem by his Syrian tribal allies. Ali was assassinated by a Kharijite in January 661. His son Hasan succeeded him but abdicated in return for compensation upon Mu'awiya's arrival to Iraq with his Syrian army in the summer. At that point, Mu'awiya entered Kufa and received the allegiance of the Iraqis.

Sufyanid period

Caliphate of Mu'awiya

The recognition of Mu'awiya in Kufa, referred to as the "year of unification of the community" in the Muslim traditional sources, is generally considered the start of his caliphate. With his accession, the political capital and the caliphal treasury were transferred to Damascus, the seat of Mu'awiya's power. Syria's emergence as the metropolis of the Umayyad Caliphate was the result of Mu'awiya's twenty-year entrenchment in the province, the geographic distribution of its relatively large Arab population throughout the province in contrast to their seclusion in garrison cities in other provinces, and the domination of a single tribal confederation, the Kalb-led Quda'a, as opposed to the wide array of competing tribal groups in Iraq. The long-established, formerly Christian Arab tribes in Syria, having been integrated into the military of the Byzantine Empire and their Ghassanid client kings, were "more accustomed to order and obedience" than their Iraqi counterparts, according to the historian Julius Wellhausen. Mu'awiya relied on the powerful Kalbite chief Ibn Bahdal and the Kindite nobleman Shurahbil ibn Simt alongside the Qurayshite commanders al-Dahhak ibn Qays al-Fihri and Abd al-Rahman, the son of the prominent general Khalid ibn al-Walid, to guarantee the loyalty of the key military components of Syria. Mu'awiya preoccupied his core Syrian troops in nearly annual or bi-annual land and sea raids against Byzantium, which provided them with battlefield experience and war spoils, but secured no permanent territorial gains. Toward the end of his reign the caliph entered a thirty-year truce with Byzantine emperor Constantine IV, obliging the Umayyads to pay the Empire an annual tribute of gold, horses and slaves.

Mu'awiya's main challenge was reestablishing the unity of the Muslim community and asserting his authority and that of the caliphate in the provinces amid the political and social disintegration of the First Fitna. There remained significant opposition to his assumption of the caliphate and to a strong central government. The garrison towns of Kufa and Basra, populated by the Arab immigrants and troops who arrived during the conquest of Iraq in the 630s–640s, resented the transition of power to Syria. They remained divided, nonetheless, as both cities competed for power and influence in Iraq and its eastern dependencies and remained divided between the Arab tribal nobility and the early Muslim converts, the latter of whom were divided between the pro-Alids (loyalists of Ali) and the Kharijites, who followed their own strict interpretation of Islam. The caliph applied a decentralized approach to governing Iraq by forging alliances with its tribal nobility, such as the Kufan leader al-Ash'ath ibn Qays, and entrusting the administration of Kufa and Basra to highly experienced members of the Thaqif tribe, al-Mughira ibn Shu'ba and the latter's protege Ziyad ibn Abihi (whom Mu'awiya adopted as his half-brother), respectively. In return for recognizing his suzerainty, maintaining order, and forwarding a token portion of the provincial tax revenues to Damascus, the caliph let his governors rule with practical independence. After al-Mughira's death in 670, Mu'awiya attached Kufa and its dependencies to the governorship of Basra, making Ziyad the practical viceroy over the eastern half of the caliphate. Afterward, Ziyad launched a concerted campaign to firmly establish Arab rule in the vast Khurasan region east of Iran and restart the Muslim conquests in the surrounding areas. Not long after Ziyad's death, he was succeeded by his son Ubayd Allah ibn Ziyad. Meanwhile, Amr ibn al-As ruled Egypt from the provincial capital of Fustat as a virtual partner of Mu'awiya until his death in 663, after which loyalist governors were appointed and the province became a practical appendage of Syria. Under Mu'awiya's direction, the Muslim conquest of Ifriqiya (central North Africa) was launched by the commander Uqba ibn Nafi in 670, which extended Umayyad control as far as Byzacena (modern southern Tunisia), where Uqba founded the permanent Arab garrison city of Kairouan.

Succession of Yazid I and collapse of Sufyanid rule

In contrast to Uthman, Mu'awiya restricted the influence of his Umayyad kinsmen to the governorship of Medina, where the dispossessed Islamic elite, including the Umayyads, was suspicious or hostile toward his rule. However, in an unprecedented move in Islamic politics, Mu'awiya nominated his own son, Yazid I, as his successor in 676, introducing hereditary rule to caliphal succession and, in practice, turning the office of the caliph into a kingship. The act was met with disapproval or opposition by the Iraqis and the Hejaz-based Quraysh, including the Umayyads, but most were bribed or coerced into acceptance. Yazid acceded after Mu'awiya's death in 680 and almost immediately faced a challenge to his rule by the Kufan partisans of Ali who had invited Ali's son and Muhammad's grandson Husayn to stage a revolt against Umayyad rule from Iraq. An army mobilized by Iraq's governor Ibn Ziyad intercepted and killed Husayn outside Kufa at the Battle of Karbala. Although it stymied active opposition to Yazid in Iraq, the killing of Muhammad's grandson left many Muslims outraged and significantly increased Kufan hostility toward the Umayyads and sympathy for the family of Ali.

The next major challenge to Yazid's rule emanated from the Hejaz where Abd Allah ibn al-Zubayr, the son of al-Zubayr ibn al-Awwam and grandson of Abu Bakr, advocated for a shura among the Quraysh to elect the caliph and rallied opposition to the Umayyads from his headquarters in Islam's holiest sanctuary, the Ka'aba in Mecca. The Ansar and Quraysh of Medina also took up the anti-Umayyad cause and in 683 expelled the Umayyads from the city. Yazid's Syrian troops routed the Medinans at the Battle of al-Harra and subsequently plundered Medina before besieging Ibn al-Zubayr in Mecca. The Syrians withdrew upon news of Yazid's death in 683, after which Ibn al-Zubayr declared himself caliph and soon after gained recognition in most provinces of the caliphate, including Iraq and Egypt. In Syria Ibn Bahdal secured the succession of Yazid's son and appointed successor Mu'awiya II, whose authority was likely restricted to Damascus and Syria's southern districts. Mu'awiya II had been ill from the beginning of his accession, with al-Dahhak assuming the practical duties of his office, and he died in early 684 without naming a successor. His death marked the end of the Umayyads' Sufyanid ruling house, called after Mu'awiya I's father Abu Sufyan.

Early Marwanid period

Marwanid transition and end of Second Fitna

Umayyad authority nearly collapsed in their Syrian stronghold after the death of Mu'awiya II. Al-Dahhak in Damascus, the Qays tribes in Qinnasrin (northern Syria) and the Jazira, the Judham in Palestine, and the Ansar and South Arabians of Homs all opted to recognize Ibn al-Zubayr. Marwan ibn al-Hakam, the leader of the Umayyads expelled to Syria from Medina, was prepared to submit to Ibn al-Zubayr as well but was persuaded to forward his candidacy for the caliphate by Ibn Ziyad. The latter had been driven out of Iraq and strove to uphold Umayyad rule. During a summit of pro-Umayyad Syrian tribes, namely the Quda'a and their Kindite allies, organized by Ibn Bahdal in the old Ghassanid capital of Jabiya, Marwan was elected caliph in exchange for economic privileges to the loyalist tribes. At the subsequent Battle of Marj Rahit in August 684, Marwan led his tribal allies to a decisive victory against a much larger Qaysite army led by al-Dahhak, who was slain. Not long after, the South Arabians of Homs and the Judham joined the Quda'a to form the tribal confederation of Yaman. Marj Rahit led to the long-running conflict between the Qays and Yaman coalitions. The Qays regrouped in the Euphrates river fortress of Circesium under Zufar ibn al-Harith al-Kilabi and moved to avenge their losses. Although Marwan regained full control of Syria in the months following the battle, the inter-tribal strife undermined the foundation of Umayyad power: the Syrian army.

In 685, Marwan and Ibn Bahdal expelled the Zubayrid governor of Egypt and replaced him with Marwan's son Abd al-Aziz, who would rule the province until his death in 704/05. Another son, Muhammad, was appointed to suppress Zufar's rebellion in the Jazira. Marwan died in April 685 and was succeeded by his eldest son Abd al-Malik. Although Ibn Ziyad attempted to restore the Syrian army of the Sufyanid caliphs, persistent divisions along Qays–Yaman lines contributed to the army's massive rout and Ibn Ziyad's death at the hands of the pro-Alid forces of Mukhtar al-Thaqafi of Kufa at the Battle of Khazir in August 686. The setback delayed Abd al-Malik's attempts to reestablish Umayyad authority in Iraq, while pressures from the Byzantine Empire and raids into Syria by the Byzantines' Mardaite allies compelled him to sign a peace treaty with Byzantium in 689 which substantially increased the Umayyads' annual tribute to the Empire. During his siege of Circesium in 691, Abd al-Malik reconciled with Zufar and the Qays by offering them privileged positions in the Umayyad court and army, signaling a new policy by the caliph and his successors to balance the interests of the Qays and Yaman in the Umayyad state. With his unified army, Abd al-Malik marched against the Zubayrids of Iraq, having already secretly secured the defection of the province's leading tribal chiefs, and defeated Iraq's ruler, Ibn al-Zubayr's brother Mus'ab, at the Battle of Maskin in 691. Afterward, the Umayyad commander al-Hajjaj ibn Yusuf besieged Mecca and killed Ibn al-Zubayr in 692, marking the end of the Second Fitna and the reunification of the caliphate under Abd al-Malik's rule.

Domestic consolidation and centralization

Iraq remained politically unstable and the garrisons of Kufa and Basra had become exhausted by warfare with Kharijite rebels. In 694 Abd al-Malik combined both cities as a single province under the governorship of al-Hajjaj, who oversaw the suppression of the Kharijite revolts in Iraq and Iran by 698 and was subsequently given authority over the rest of the eastern caliphate. The leader of the rebels was the Kufan nobleman Ibn al-Ash'ath, grandson of al-Ash'ath ibn Qays. Al-Hajjaj defeated Ibn al-Ash'ath's rebels at the Battle of Dayr al-Jamajim in April. The suppression of the revolt marked the end of the Iraqi muqātila as a military force and the beginning of Syrian military domination of Iraq. Iraqi internal divisions, and the utilization of more disciplined Syrian forces by Abd al-Malik and al-Hajjaj, voided the Iraqis' attempt to reassert power in the province.

To consolidate Umayyad rule after the Second Fitna, the Marwanids launched a series of centralization, Islamization and Arabization measures. To prevent further rebellions in Iraq, al-Hajjaj founded a permanent Syrian garrison in Wasit, situated between Kufa and Basra, and instituted a more rigorous administration in the province. Power thereafter derived from the Syrian troops, who became Iraq's ruling class, while Iraq's Arab nobility, religious scholars and mawālī became their virtual subjects. The surplus from the agriculturally rich Sawad lands was redirected from the muqātila to the caliphal treasury in Damascus to pay the Syrian troops in Iraq. The system of military pay established by Umar, which paid stipends to veterans of the earlier Muslim conquests and their descendants, was ended, salaries being restricted to those in active service. The old system was considered a handicap on Abd al-Malik's executive authority and financial ability to reward loyalists in the army. Thus, a professional army was established during Abd al-Malik's reign whose salaries derived from tax proceeds.

In 693, the Byzantine gold solidus was replaced in Syria and Egypt with the dinar. Initially, the new coinage contained depictions of the caliph as the spiritual leader of the Muslim community and its supreme military commander. This image proved no less acceptable to Muslim officialdom and was replaced in 696 or 697 with image-less coinage inscribed with Qur'anic quotes and other Muslim religious formulas. In 698/99, similar changes were made to the silver dirhams issued by the Muslims in the former Sasanian Persian lands of the eastern caliphate. Arabic replaced Persian as the language of the dīwān in Iraq in 697, Greek in the Syrian dīwān in 700, and Greek and Coptic in the Egyptian dīwān in 705/06. Arabic ultimately became the sole official language of the Umayyad state, but the transition in faraway provinces, such as Khurasan, did not occur until the 740s. Although the official language was changed, Greek and Persian-speaking bureaucrats who were versed in Arabic kept their posts. According to Gibb, the decrees were the "first step towards the reorganization and unification of the diverse tax-systems in the provinces, and also a step towards a more definitely Muslim administration". Indeed, it formed an important part of the Islamization measures that lent the Umayyad Caliphate "a more ideological and programmatic coloring it had previously lacked", according to Blankinship.

In 691/92, Abd al-Malik completed the Dome of the Rock in Jerusalem. It was possibly intended as a monument of victory over the Christians that would distinguish Islam's uniqueness within the common Abrahamic setting of Jerusalem, home of the two older Abrahamic faiths, Judaism and Christianity. An alternative motive may have been to divert the religious focus of Muslims in the Umayyad realm from the Ka'aba in Zubayrid Mecca (683–692), where the Umayyads were routinely condemned during the Hajj. In Damascus, Abd al-Malik's son and successor al-Walid I confiscated the cathedral of St. John the Baptist and founded the Great Mosque in its place as a "symbol of the political supremacy and moral prestige of Islam", according to historian Nikita Elisséeff. Noting al-Walid's awareness of architecture's propaganda value, historian Robert Hillenbrand calls the Damascus mosque a "victory monument" intended as a "visible statement of Muslim supremacy and permanence".

Renewal of conquests

Under al-Walid I the Umayyad Caliphate reached its greatest territorial extent. The war with the Byzantines had resumed under his father after the civil war, with the Umayyads defeating the Byzantines at the Battle of Sebastopolis in 692. The Umayyads frequently raided Byzantine Anatolia and Armenia in the following years. By 705, Armenia was annexed by the caliphate along with the principalities of Caucasian Albania and Iberia, which collectively became the province of Arminiya. In 695–698 the commander Hassan ibn al-Nu'man al-Ghassani restored Umayyad control over Ifriqiya after defeating the Byzantines and Berbers there. Carthage was captured and destroyed in 698, signaling "the final, irretrievable end of Roman power in Africa", according to Kennedy. Kairouan was firmly secured as a launchpad for later conquests, while the port town of Tunis was founded and equipped with an arsenal on Abd al-Malik's orders to establish a strong Arab fleet. Hassan ibn al-Nu'man continued the campaign against the Berbers, defeating them and killing their leader, the warrior queen al-Kahina, between 698 and 703. His successor in Ifriqiya, Musa ibn Nusayr, subjugated the Berbers of the Hawwara, Zenata and Kutama confederations and advanced into the Maghreb (western North Africa), conquering Tangier and Sus in 708/09. Musa's Berber mawla, Tariq ibn Ziyad, invaded the Visigothic Kingdom of Hispania (the Iberian Peninsula) in 711 and within five years most of Hispania was conquered.

Al-Hajjaj managed the eastern expansion from Iraq. His lieutenant governor of Khurasan, Qutayba ibn Muslim, launched numerous campaigns against Transoxiana (Central Asia), which had been a largely impenetrable region for earlier Muslim armies, between 705 and 715. Despite the distance from the Arab garrison towns of Khurasan, the unfavorable terrain and climate and his enemies' numerical superiority, Qutayba, through his persistent raids, gained the surrender of Bukhara in 706–709, Khwarazm and Samarkand in 711–712 and Farghana in 713. He established Arab garrisons and tax administrations in Samarkand and Bukhara and demolished their Zoroastrian fire temples. Both cities developed as future centers of Islamic and Arabic learning. Umayyad suzerainty was secured over the rest of conquered Transoxiana through tributary alliances with local rulers, whose power remained intact.
From 708/09, al-Hajjaj's kinsman Muhammad ibn al-Qasim conquered northwestern South Asia and established out of this new territory the province of Sind. The massive war spoils netted by the conquests of Transoxiana, Sind and Hispania were comparable to the amounts accrued in the early Muslim conquests during the reign of Caliph Umar.

Al-Walid I's successor, his brother Sulayman, continued his predecessors' militarist policies, but expansion mostly ground to a halt during his reign. The deaths of al-Hajjaj in 714 and Qutayba in 715 left the Arab armies in Transoxiana in disarray. For the next twenty-five years, no further eastward conquests were undertaken and the Arabs lost territory. The Tang Chinese defeated the Arabs at the Battle of Aksu in 717, forcing their withdrawal to Tashkent. Meanwhile, in 716, the governor of Khurasan, Yazid ibn al-Muhallab, attempted to conquer the principalities of Jurjan and Tabaristan along the southern Caspian coast. His Khurasani and Iraqi troops were reinforced by Syrians, marking their first deployment to Khurasan, but the Arabs' initial successes were reversed by the local Iranian coalition of Farrukhan the Great. Afterward, the Arabs withdrew in return for a tributary agreement.

On the Byzantine front, Sulayman took up his predecessor's project to capture Constantinople with increased vigor. His brother Maslama besieged the Byzantine capital from the land, while Umar ibn Hubayra al-Fazari launched a naval campaign against the city. The Byzantines destroyed the Umayyad fleets and defeated Maslama's army, prompting his withdrawal to Syria in 718. The massive losses incurred during the campaign led to a partial retrenchment of Umayyad forces from the captured Byzantine frontier districts, but already in 720, Umayyad raids against Byzantium recommenced. Nevertheless, the goal of conquering Constantinople was effectively abandoned, and the frontier between the two empires stabilized along the line of the Taurus and Anti-Taurus Mountains, over which both sides continued to launch regular raids and counter-raids during the next centuries.

Caliphate of Umar II
Contrary to expectations of a son or brother succeeding him, Sulayman had nominated his cousin, Umar ibn Abd al-Aziz (or Umar II), as his successor and he took office in 717. After the Arabs' severe losses in the offensive against Constantinople, Umar drew down Arab forces on the caliphate's war fronts, though Narbonne in modern France was conquered during his reign. To maintain stronger oversight in the provinces, Umar dismissed all his predecessors' governors, his new appointees being generally competent men he could control. To that end, the massive viceroyalty of Iraq and the east was broken up. 

Umar's most significant policy entailed fiscal reforms to equalize the status of the Arabs and mawali, thus remedying a long-standing issue which threatened the Muslim community. The jizya (poll tax) on the mawali was eliminated. Since avoidance of taxation incentivized both mass conversions to Islam and abandonment of land for migration to the garrison cities, it put a strain on tax revenues, especially in Egypt, Iraq and Khurasan. Thus, "the Umayyad rulers had a vested interest in preventing the conquered peoples from accepting Islam or forcing them to continue paying those taxes from which they claimed exemption as Muslims", according to Hawting.

In tandem, Umar intensified the Islamization drive of his Marwanid predecessors, enacting measures to distinguish Muslims from non-Muslims and inaugurating Islamic iconoclasm. His position among the Umayyad caliphs is unusual, in that he became the only one to have been recognized in subsequent Islamic tradition as a genuine caliph (khalifa) and not merely as a worldly king (malik).

Late Marwanid period
After the death of Umar, another son of Abd al-Malik, Yazid II (720–724) became caliph. Yazid is best known for his "iconoclastic edict", which ordered the destruction of Christian images within the territory of the caliphate. In 720, another major revolt arose in Iraq, this time led by Yazid ibn al-Muhallab.

Caliphate of Hisham and end of expansion

The final son of Abd al-Malik to become caliph was Hisham (724–43), whose long and eventful reign was above all marked by the curtailment of military expansion. Hisham established his court at Resafa in northern Syria, which was closer to the Byzantine border than Damascus, and resumed hostilities against the Byzantines, which had lapsed following the failure of the last siege of Constantinople. The new campaigns resulted in a number of successful raids into Anatolia, but also in a major defeat (the Battle of Akroinon), and did not lead to any significant territorial expansion.

From the caliphate's north-western African bases, a series of raids on coastal areas of the Visigothic Kingdom paved the way to the permanent occupation of most of Iberia by the Umayyads (starting in 711), and on into south-eastern Gaul (last stronghold at Narbonne in 759). Hisham's reign witnessed the end of expansion in the west, following the defeat of the Arab army by the Franks at the Battle of Tours in 732. In 739 a major Berber Revolt broke out in North Africa, which was probably the largest military setback in the reign of Caliph Hisham. From it emerged some of the first Muslim states outside the caliphate. It is also regarded as the beginning of Moroccan independence, as Morocco would never again come under the rule of an eastern caliph or any other foreign power until the 20th century. It was followed by the collapse of Umayyad authority in al-Andalus. In South Asia, the Umayyad armies were defeated by the Chalukya dynasty in the south and the Pratiharas Dynasty in the north, stagnating further eastward Arab expansion.

In the Caucasus, the confrontation with the Khazars peaked under Hisham: the Arabs established Derbent as a major military base and launched several invasions of the northern Caucasus, but failed to subdue the nomadic Khazars. The conflict was arduous and bloody, and the Arab army even suffered a major defeat at the Battle of Marj Ardabil in 730. Marwan ibn Muhammad, the future Marwan II, finally ended the war in 737 with a massive invasion that is reported to have reached as far as the Volga, but the Khazars remained unsubdued.

Hisham suffered still worse defeats in the east, where his armies attempted to subdue both Tokharistan, with its centre at Balkh, and Transoxiana, with its centre at Samarkand. Both areas had already been partially conquered but remained difficult to govern. Once again, a particular difficulty concerned the question of the conversion of non-Arabs, especially the Sogdians of Transoxiana. Following the Umayyad defeat in the "Day of Thirst" in 724, Ashras ibn 'Abd Allah al-Sulami, governor of Khurasan, promised tax relief to those Sogdians who converted to Islam but went back on his offer when it proved too popular and threatened to reduce tax revenues.

Discontent among the Khorasani Arabs rose sharply after the losses suffered in the Battle of the Defile in 731. In 734, al-Harith ibn Surayj led a revolt that received broad backing from Arabs and natives alike, capturing Balkh but failing to take Merv. After this defeat, al-Harith's movement seems to have been dissolved. The problem of the rights of non-Arab Muslims would continue to plague the Umayyads.

Third Fitna

Hisham was succeeded by Al-Walid II (743–44), the son of Yazid II. Al-Walid is reported to have been more interested in earthly pleasures than in religion, a reputation that may be confirmed by the decoration of the so-called "desert palaces" (including Qusayr Amra and Khirbat al-Mafjar) that have been attributed to him. He quickly attracted the enmity of many, both by executing a number of those who had opposed his accession and by persecuting the Qadariyya.

In 744, Yazid III, a son of al-Walid I, was proclaimed caliph in Damascus, and his army tracked down and killed al-Walid II. Yazid III has received a certain reputation for piety and may have been sympathetic to the Qadariyya. He died a mere six months into his reign.

Yazid had appointed his brother, Ibrahim, as his successor, but Marwan II (744–50), the grandson of Marwan I, led an army from the northern frontier and entered Damascus in December 744, where he was proclaimed caliph. Marwan immediately moved the capital north to Harran, in present-day Turkey. A rebellion soon broke out in Syria, perhaps due to resentment over the relocation of the capital, and in 746 Marwan razed the walls of Homs and Damascus in retaliation.

Marwan also faced significant opposition from Kharijites in Iraq and Iran, who put forth first Dahhak ibn Qays and then Abu Dulaf as rival caliphs. In 747, Marwan managed to reestablish control of Iraq, but by this time a more serious threat had arisen in Khorasan.

Abbasid Revolution and fall

The Hashimiyya movement (a sub-sect of the Kaysanites Shia), led by the Abbasid family, overthrew the Umayyad caliphate. The Abbasids were members of the Hashim clan, rivals of the Umayyads, but the word "Hashimiyya" seems to refer specifically to Abu Hashim, a grandson of Ali and son of Muhammad ibn al-Hanafiyya. According to certain traditions, Abu Hashim died in 717 in Humeima in the house of Muhammad ibn Ali, the head of the Abbasid family, and before dying named Muhammad ibn Ali as his successor. This tradition allowed the Abbasids to rally the supporters of the failed revolt of Mukhtar, who had represented themselves as the supporters of Muhammad ibn al-Hanafiyya.

Beginning around 719, Hashimiyya missions began to seek adherents in Khurasan. Their campaign was framed as one of proselytism (dawah). They sought support for a "member of the family" of Muhammad, without making explicit mention of the Abbasids. These missions met with success both among Arabs and non-Arabs (mawali), although the latter may have played a particularly important role in the growth of the movement.

Around 746, Abu Muslim assumed leadership of the Hashimiyya in Khurasan. In 747, he successfully initiated an open revolt against Umayyad rule, which was carried out under the sign of the black flag. He soon established control of Khurasan, expelling its Umayyad governor, Nasr ibn Sayyar, and dispatched an army westwards. Kufa fell to the Hashimiyya in 749, the last Umayyad stronghold in Iraq, Wasit, was placed under siege, and in November of the same year Abul Abbas as-Saffah was recognized as the new caliph in the mosque at Kufa. At this point Marwan mobilized his troops from Harran and advanced toward Iraq. In January 750 the two forces met in the Battle of the Zab, and the Umayyads were defeated. Damascus fell to the Abbasids in April, and in August, Marwan was killed in Egypt. Some Umayyads in Syria continued to resist the takeover. The Umayyad princes Abu Muhammad al-Sufyani, al-Abbas ibn Muhammad, and Hashim ibn Yazid launched revolts in Syria and the Islamic–Byzantine frontier around late 750, but they were defeated.

The victors desecrated the tombs of the Umayyads in Syria, sparing only that of Umar II, and most of the remaining members of the Umayyad family were tracked down and killed. When Abbasids declared amnesty for members of the Umayyad family, eighty gathered to receive pardons, and all were massacred. One grandson of Hisham, Abd al-Rahman I, survived, escaped across North Africa, and established an emirate in Moorish Iberia (Al-Andalus). In a claim unrecognized outside of al-Andalus, he maintained that the Umayyad Caliphate, the true, authentic caliphate, more legitimate than the Abbasids, was continued through him in Córdoba. It was to survive for centuries.

Some Umayyads also survived in Syria, and their descendants would once more attempt to restore their old regime during the Fourth Fitna. Two Umayyads, Abu al-Umaytir al-Sufyani and Maslama ibn Ya'qub, successively seized control of Damascus from 811 to 813, and declared themselves caliphs. However, their rebellions were suppressed.

Previté-Orton argues that the reason for the decline of the Umayyads was the rapid expansion of Islam. During the Umayyad period, mass conversions brought Persians, Berbers, Copts, and Aramaic to Islam. These mawalis (clients) were often better educated and more civilised than their Arab overlords. The new converts, on the basis of equality of all Muslims, transformed the political landscape. Previté-Orton also argues that the feud between Syria and Iraq further weakened the empire.

Administration
The first four caliphs created a stable administration for the empire, following the practices and administrative institutions of the Byzantine Empire which had ruled the same region previously. These consisted of four main governmental branches: political affairs, military affairs, tax collection, and religious administration. Each of these was further subdivided into more branches, offices, and departments.

Provinces
Geographically, the empire was divided into several provinces, the borders of which changed numerous times during the Umayyad reign. Each province had a governor appointed by the caliph. The governor was in charge of the religious officials, army leaders, police, and civil administrators in his province. Local expenses were paid for by taxes coming from that province, with the remainder each year being sent to the central government in Damascus. As the central power of the Umayyad rulers waned in the later years of the dynasty, some governors neglected to send the extra tax revenue to Damascus and created great personal fortunes.

Government workers
As the empire grew, the number of qualified Arab workers was too small to keep up with the rapid expansion of the empire. Therefore, Muawiya allowed many of the local government workers in conquered provinces to keep their jobs under the new Umayyad government. Thus, much of the local government's work was recorded in Greek, Coptic, and Persian. It was only during the reign of Abd al-Malik that government work began to be regularly recorded in Arabic.

Military
The Umayyad army was mainly Arab, with its core consisting of those who had settled in urban Syria and the Arab tribes who originally served in the army of the Eastern Roman Empire in Syria. These were supported by tribes in the Syrian desert and in the frontier with the Byzantines, as well as Christian Syrian tribes. Soldiers were registered with the Army Ministry, the Diwan Al-Jaysh, and were salaried. The army was divided into junds based on regional fortified cities. The Umayyad Syrian forces specialised in close order infantry warfare, and favoured using a kneeling spear wall formation in battle, probably as a result of their encounters with Roman armies. This was radically different from the original Bedouin style of mobile and individualistic fighting.

Currency
The Byzantine and Sassanid Empires relied on money economies before the Muslim conquest, and that system remained in effect during the Umayyad period. Byzantine coinage was used until 658; Byzantine gold coins were still in use until the monetary reforms c.700. In addition to this, the Umayyad government began to mint its own coins in Damascus, which were initially similar to pre-existing coins but evolved in an independent direction. These were the first coins minted by a Muslim government in history. Gold coins were called "dinars" while silver coins were called "dirhams".

Central diwans
To assist the caliph in administration there were six boards at the centre: Diwan al-Kharaj (the Board of Revenue), Diwan al-Rasa'il (the Board of Correspondence), Diwan al-Khatam (the Board of Signet), Diwan al-Barid (the Board of Posts), Diwan al-Qudat (the Board of Justice) and Diwan al-Jund (the Military Board)

Diwan al-Kharaj
The Central Board of Revenue administered the entire finances of the empire. It also imposed and collected taxes and disbursed revenue.

Diwan al-Rasa'il
A regular Board of Correspondence was established under the Umayyads. It issued state missives and circulars to the Central and Provincial Officers. It coordinated the work of all Boards and dealt with all correspondence as the chief secretariat.

Diwan al-Khatam
In order to reduce forgery, Diwan al-Khatam (Bureau of Registry), a kind of state chancellery, was instituted by Mu'awiyah. It used to make and preserve a copy of each official document before sealing and despatching the original to its destination. Thus in the course of time a state archive developed in Damascus by the Umayyads under Abd al-Malik. This department survived till the middle of the Abbasid period.

Diwan al-Barid

Mu'awiyah introduced the postal service, Abd al-Malik extended it throughout his empire, and Walid made full use of it. Umar bin Abdul-Aziz developed it further by building caravanserais at stages along the Khurasan highway. Relays of horses were used for the conveyance of dispatches between the caliph and his agents and officials posted in the provinces. The main highways were divided into stages of  each and each stage had horses, donkeys, or camels ready to carry the post. Primarily the service met the needs of Government officials, but travellers and their important dispatches were also benefited by the system. The postal carriages were also used for the swift transport of troops. They were able to carry fifty to a hundred men at a time. Under Governor Yusuf bin Umar, the postal department of Iraq costs 4,000,000 dirhams a year.

Diwan al-Qudat

In the early period of Islam, justice was administered by Muhammad and the orthodox caliphs in person. After the expansion of the Islamic State, Umar al-Faruq had to separate the judiciary from the general administration and appointed the first qadi in Egypt as early as AD 643/23 AH. After 661, a series of judges served in Egypt during the caliphates of Hisham and Walid II.

Diwan al-Jund
The Diwan of Umar, assigning annuities to all Arabs and to the Muslim soldiers of other races, underwent a change in the hands of the Umayyads. The Umayyads meddled with the register and the recipients regarded pensions as the subsistence allowance even without being in active service. Hisham reformed it and paid only to those who participated in the battle.
On the pattern of the Byzantine system, the Umayyads reformed their army organization in general and divided it into five corps: the centre, two wings, vanguards, and rearguards, following the same formation while on the march or on a battlefield. Marwan II (740–50) abandoned the old division and introduced the Kurdus (cohort), a small compact body.
The Umayyad troops were divided into three divisions: infantry, cavalry, and artillery. Arab troops were dressed and armed in Greek fashion. The Umayyad cavalry used plain and round saddles. The artillery used the arradah (ballista), the manjaniq (mangonel), and the dabbabah or kabsh (battering ram). The heavy engines, siege machines, and baggage were carried on camels behind the army.

Social organization

The Umayyad Caliphate had four main social classes:
 Muslim Arabs
 Muslim non-Arabs (clients of the Muslim Arabs)
 Dhimmis (non-Muslim free persons such as Christians, Jews and Zoroastrians)
 Slaves

The Muslim Arabs were at the top of the society and saw it as their duty to rule over the conquered areas. The Arab Muslims held themselves in higher esteem than Muslim non-Arabs and generally did not mix with other Muslims.

As Islam spread, more and more of the Muslim population consisted of non-Arabs. This caused social unrest, as the new converts were not given the same rights as Muslim Arabs. Also, as conversions increased, tax revenues (peasant tax) from non-Muslims decreased to dangerous lows. These issues continued to worsen until they helped cause the Abbasid Revolt in the 740s.

Non-Muslims
Non-Muslim groups in the Umayyad Caliphate, which included Christians, Jews, Zoroastrians, and pagans, were called dhimmis. They were given a legally protected status as second-class citizens as long as they accepted and acknowledged the political supremacy of the ruling Muslims, i.e. paid a tax, known as jizya, which the Muslims did not have to pay, who would instead pay the zakat tax. If they converted to Islam they would cease paying jizya and would instead pay zakat.

Although the Umayyads were harsh when it came to defeating their Zoroastrian adversaries, they did offer protection and relative religious tolerance to the Zoroastrians who accepted their authority. As a matter of fact, Umar II was reported to have said in one of his letters commanding not to "destroy a synagogue or a church or temple of fire worshippers (meaning the Zoroastrians) as long as they have reconciled with and agreed upon with the Muslims". Fred Donner says that Zoroastrians in the northern parts of Iran were hardly penetrated by the "believers", winning virtually complete autonomy in-return for tribute-tax or jizyah. Donner adds "Zoroastrians continued to exist in large numbers in northern and western Iran and elsewhere for centuries after the rise of Islam, and indeed, much of the canon of Zoroastrian religious texts was elaborated and written down during the Islamic period."

Christians and Jews still continued to produce great theological thinkers within their communities, but as time wore on, many of the intellectuals converted to Islam, leading to a lack of great thinkers in the non-Muslim communities. Important Christian writers from the Umayyad period include the theologian John of Damascus, bishop Cosmas of Maiuma, Pope Benjamin I of Alexandria and Isaac of Nineveh.

Although non-Muslims could not hold the highest public offices in the empire, they held many bureaucratic positions within the government. An important example of Christian employment in the Umayyad government is that of Sarjun ibn Mansur. He was a Melkite Christian official of the early Umayyad Caliphate. The son of a prominent Byzantine official of Damascus, he was a favourite of the early Umayyad caliphs Mu'awiya I and Yazid I, and served as the head of the fiscal administration for Syria from the mid-7th century until the year 700, when Caliph Abd al-Malik ibn Marwan dismissed him as part of his efforts to Arabicize the administration of the caliphate. According to the Muslim historians al-Baladhuri and al-Tabari, Sarjun was a mawla of the first Umayyad caliph, Mu'awiya I, serving as his "secretary and the person in charge of his business". The hagiographies, although less reliable, also assign to him a role in the administration, even as "ruler" (archon or even amir), of Damascus and its environs, where he was responsible for collecting the revenue. In this capacity, he is attested in later collections of source material such as that of al-Mas'udi. Sarjun ibn Mansur was replaced by Sulayman ibn Sa'd al-Khushani, another Christian.

Muawiya's marriage to Maysun bint Bahdal (Yazid's mother) was politically motivated, as she was the daughter of the chief of the Kalb tribe, which was a large Syriac Orthodox Christian Arab tribe in Syria. The Kalb tribe had remained largely neutral when the Muslims first went into Syria. After the plague that killed much of the Muslim army in Syria, by marrying Maysun, Muawiyah used the Syriac Orthodox Christians against the Byzantines.

Tom Holland writes that Christians, Jews, Samaritans and Manichaeans were all treated well by Muawiyah. Muawiyah even restored Edessa's cathedral after it had been toppled by an earthquake. Holland also writes that, "Savagely though Muawiyah prosecuted his wars against the Romans, yet his subjects, no longer trampled by rival armies, no longer divided by hostile watchtowers, knew only peace at last. Justice flourished in his time, and there was great peace in the regions under his control. He allowed everyone to live as they wanted."

Legacy

The Umayyad caliphate was marked both by territorial expansion and by the administrative and cultural problems that such expansion created. Despite some notable exceptions, the Umayyads tended to favor the rights of the old Arab families, and in particular their own, over those of newly converted Muslims (mawali). Therefore, they held to a less universalist conception of Islam than did many of their rivals. As G.R. Hawting has written, "Islam was in fact regarded as the property of the conquering aristocracy."

During the period of the Umayyads, Arabic became the administrative language and the process of Arabization was initiated in the Levant, Mesopotamia, North Africa, and Iberia. State documents and currency were issued in Arabic. Mass conversions also created a growing population of Muslims in the territory of the caliphate.

According to one common view, the Umayyads transformed the caliphate from a religious institution (during the Rashidun caliphate) to a dynastic one. However, the Umayyad caliphs do seem to have understood themselves as the representatives of God on earth, and to have been responsible for the "definition and elaboration of God's ordinances, or in other words the definition or elaboration of Islamic law."

The Umayyads have met with a largely negative reception from later Islamic historians, who have accused them of promoting a kingship (mulk, a term with connotations of tyranny) instead of a true caliphate (khilafa). In this respect it is notable that the Umayyad caliphs referred to themselves not as khalifat rasul Allah ("successor of the messenger of God", the title preferred by the tradition), but rather as khalifat Allah ("deputy of God"). The distinction seems to indicate that the Umayyads "regarded themselves as God's representatives at the head of the community and saw no need to share their religious power with, or delegate it to, the emergent class of religious scholars." In fact, it was precisely this class of scholars, based largely in Iraq, that was responsible for collecting and recording the traditions that form the primary source material for the history of the Umayyad period. In reconstructing this history, therefore, it is necessary to rely mainly on sources, such as the histories of Tabari and Baladhuri, that were written in the Abbasid court at Baghdad.

Modern Arab nationalism regards the period of the Umayyads as part of the Arab Golden Age which it sought to emulate and restore.
This is particularly true of Syrian nationalists and the present-day state of Syria, centered like that of the Umayyads on Damascus. The Umayyad banners were white, after the banner of Muawiya ibn Abi Sufyan; it is now one of the four Pan-Arab colours which appear in various combinations on the flags of most Arab countries.

Architecture 

Throughout the Levant, Egypt and North Africa, the Umayyads constructed grand congregational mosques and desert palaces, as well as various garrison cities (amsar) to fortify their frontiers such as Fustat, Kairouan, Kufa, Basra and Mansura. Many of these buildings feature Byzantine stylistic and architectural features, such as Roman mosaics and Corinthian columns. Their most famous constructions include the Dome of the Rock at Jerusalem and the Umayyad Mosque at Damascus, and other constructions include Hisham's Palace, Qusayr' Amra, the Great Mosque of Kairouan and the Great Mosque of Aleppo. Some of these buildings, such as the Umayyad Mosque of Damascus, reflect the diversity of the empire, as thousands of Greek, Persian, Coptic, South Asian and Persian craftsmen were conscripted to construct them. The later Emirate of Cordoba (an offshoot of the Umayyad dynasty in exile) established many endearing architectural projects in the Iberian Peninsula such as the Mosque-Cathedral of Cordoba and Medina Azahara, which influenced the architectural styles during the Middle Ages.

Religious perspectives

Sunni
Many Muslims criticized the Umayyads for having too many non-Muslim, former Roman administrators in their government, e.g., St. John of Damascus. As the Muslims took over cities, they left the people's political representatives, the Roman tax collectors, and the administrators in the office. The taxes to the central government were calculated and negotiated by the people's political representatives. Both the central and local governments were compensated for the services each provided. Many Christian cities used some of the taxes to maintain their churches and run their own organizations. Later, the Umayyads were criticized by some Muslims for not reducing the taxes of the people who converted to Islam.

Later, when Umar ibn Abd al-Aziz came to power, he reduced these taxes. He is therefore praised as one of the greatest Muslim rulers after the four Rightly Guided Caliphs. Imam Abu Muhammad Abdullah ibn Abdul Hakam who lived in 829 and wrote a biography on Umar Ibn Abdul Aziz stated that the reduction in these taxes stimulated the economy and created wealth but it also reduced the government's budget, including, eventually, the defence budget.

The only Umayyad ruler who is unanimously praised by Sunni sources for his devout piety and justice is Umar ibn Abd al-Aziz. In his efforts to spread Islam, he established liberties for the Mawali by abolishing the jizya tax for converts to Islam. Imam Abu Muhammad Abdullah ibn Abdul Hakam stated that Umar ibn Abd al-Aziz also stopped the personal allowance offered to his relatives, stating that he could only give them an allowance if he gave an allowance to everyone else in the empire. After Umar ibn Abd al-Aziz was poisoned in 720, successive governments tried to reverse Umar ibn Abd al-Aziz's tax policies, but rebellion resulted.

Shi'a
The negative view of the Umayyads held by Shias is briefly expressed in the Shi'a book "Sulh al-Hasan". According to Shia hadiths, which are not considered authentic by Sunnis, Ali described them as the worst Fitna. In Shia sources, the Umayyad Caliphate is widely described as "tyrannical, anti-Islamic and godless". Shias point out that the founder of the dynasty, Muawiyah, declared himself a caliph in 657 and went to war against Muhammad's son-in-law and cousin, the ruling caliph Ali, clashing at the Battle of Siffin. Muawiyah also declared his son, Yazid, as his successor in breach of a treaty with Hassan, Muhammad's grandson. Another of Muhammad's grandsons, Husayn ibn Ali, would be killed by Yazid in the Battle of Karbala. Further Shia Imams, Ali ibn Husayn Zayn al-Abidin would be killed at the hands of ruling Umayyad caliphs.

Bahá'í
Asked for an explanation of the prophecies in the Book of Revelation (12:3), `Abdu'l-Bahá suggests in Some Answered Questions that the "great red dragon, having seven heads and ten horns, and seven crowns upon his heads," refers to the Umayyad caliphs who "rose against the religion of Prophet Muhammad and against the reality of Ali".

The seven heads of the dragon are symbolic of the seven provinces of the lands dominated by the Umayyads: Damascus, Persia, Arabia, Egypt, Africa, Andalusia, and Transoxiana. The ten horns represent the ten names of the leaders of the Umayyad dynasty: Abu Sufyan, Muawiya, Yazid, Marwan, Abd al-Malik, Walid, Sulayman, Umar, Hisham, and Ibrahim. Some names were re-used, as in the case of Yazid II and Yazid III, which were not accounted for in this interpretation.

Early literature
The book Al Muwatta, by Imam Malik, was written in the early Abbasid period in Medina. It does not contain any anti-Umayyad content because it was more concerned with what the Quran and what Muhammad said and was not a history book on the Umayyads.

Even the earliest pro-Shia accounts of al-Masudi are more balanced. Al-Masudi's Ibn Hisham is the earliest Shia account of Muawiyah. He recounted that Muawiyah spent a great deal of time in prayer, in spite of the burden of managing a large empire.

Az-Zuhri stated that Muawiya led the Hajj Pilgrimage with the people twice during his era as caliph.

Books written in the early Abbasid period like al-Baladhuri's "The Origins of the Islamic State" provide a more accurate and balanced history. Ibn Hisham also wrote about these events.

Much of the anti-Umayyad literature started to appear in the later Abbasid period in Persia.

After killing off most of the Umayyads and destroying the graves of the Umayyad rulers apart from Muawiyah and Umar ibn Abd al-Aziz, the history books were written during the later Abbasid period are more anti-Umayyad. The Abbasids justified their rule by saying that their ancestor Abbas ibn Abd al-Muttalib was a cousin of Muhammad.

The books written later in the Abbasid period in Iran are more anti-Umayyad. Iran was Sunni at the time. There was much anti-Arab feeling in Iran after the fall of the Persian empire. This anti-Arab feeling also influenced the books on Islamic history. Al-Tabri was also written in Iran during that period. Al-Tabri was a huge collection, preserving everything the compiler could find for future generations to codify and to judge whether the histories were true or false.

List of caliphs

See also
 History of Islam
 List of Sunni dynasties

Notes

References

Bibliography

Further reading
 Al-Ajmi, Abdulhadi, The Umayyads, in Muhammad in History, Thought, and Culture: An Encyclopedia of the Prophet of God (2 vols.), Edited by C. Fitzpatrick and A. Walker, Santa Barbara, ABC-CLIO, 2014. 
 A. Bewley, Mu'awiya, Restorer of the Muslim Faith (London, 2002)
 Boekhoff-van der Voort, Nicolet, Umayyad Court, in Muhammad in History, Thought, and Culture: An Encyclopedia of the Prophet of God (2 vols.), Edited by C. Fitzpatrick and A. Walker, Santa Barbara, ABC-CLIO, 2014. 
 P. Crone, Slaves on horses (Cambridge, 1980).
 P. Crone and M.A. Cook, Hagarism (Cambridge, 1977).

External links 
 

 
661 establishments
750s disestablishments
7th-century establishments in Africa
8th-century disestablishments in Africa
8th century in Al-Andalus
Caliphates
History of the Middle East
History of the Mediterranean
History of North Africa
History of Saudi Arabia
Medieval Spain
Medieval Syria
Medieval history of Iran
States in medieval Anatolia
States and territories established in the 660s
States and territories disestablished in the 8th century
Umayyad dynasty
Historical transcontinental empires